Clifford Gundle is a South African philanthropist, entrepreneur and plastics tycoon who became known as the founder of Gundle Plastics, one of the largest flexible film plastics manufacturers in the southern hemisphere.

Career

During 1959 in South Africa, Gundle founded Gundle Plastics and subsequently Aquatan Lining Systems in 1981. In 1984 he sold Gundle manufacturing systems, but retained his share Aquatan. The company went public in 1986. Growth of the company exploded after government regulations in South Africa required double lining. Other companies he founded or acquired in South Africa include SA Umbrella Manufacturers, Barrier Coatings, Concord Cupboards and Kermac Tarpaulin Manufacturers. He also established a variety of office and kitchen furniture manufacturing companies within B & S Engineering (subsequently Furntech Group), which became quoted on the Johannesburg Stock Exchange.

In the United States Gundle founded Gundle Environmental Systems in 1979, which was subsequently quoted on the American Stock Exchange. It specialised in the manufacture and installation of impervious plastic membranes for the containment of hazardous wastes. Together with partners he acquired Naltex Netting, a non-woven plastic net extrusion company, as well as American White Cross, a private label medical products company subsequently quoted on the NASDAQ.

In the United Kingdom Gundle also founded or established with partners several companies. Inpace, a computer accessory company; Innovative Technologies, a medical product manufacturer quoted on the London Stock Exchange; Zedcor, a manufacturer of waterproof sheeting for the construction industry. In 1994 he formed Knightsbridge Information Services, an economic data research company, and Aurum Fund Management, whose Funds are quoted on the Bermuda or Irish Stock Exchanges. In 1998 Citywire, an internet financial news service and financial publishing business was established with partners.

Philanthropy
Gundle has made many notable charitable donations including:
Patronage of the London Jewish Cultural Center.
Patronage of the National Theater.
Patronage of the Cameri Theater Tel Aviv.
Charitable support of the V&A museum.
Endowment of the Courtauld Institute of Art.
Deans council at the Harvard Kennedy Business School.
Donation for the British ORT.

Personal life
Clifford Gundle is married to his wife, Sooozee Gundle with whom he has had 4 children.

References

1937 births
South African businesspeople
Living people
White South African people
South African philanthropists